Persona (stylized as pɘrsona) is the third studio album by South Korean singer-songwriter Kangta. It was first released in South Korea on March 4, 2005, under S.M. Entertainment. The album's musical style differs from his previous two albums. Directed by Lee Sang-kyu, the music video for his title song "Persona" was shot in San Francisco.

Artwork 
There are several different versions of the album cover. It is very likely that most of them (if not, all) were taken at a Chinese studio by photographer Kim Joong-nam, who previously worked on the cover for Polaris. What they have in common is that they feature Kangta baring his muscular trunk while wearing white hooded attire, a silver rope necklace, and gloves. In the original version, a temporary tattoo is visible on his upper left arm. He also wore a hat for the alternate version depicted above.

Critical reception 

The album received polarized reactions from critics. Writing for online magazine IZM, Lee Dae-hwa heavily panned the album, and called it ‘a brilliant piece of crap [...] and a distorted overpackage’.

Accolades 
The title track "Persona" was nominated for the Best R&B Performance and Overseas Viewers' award at the seventh Mnet Km Music Video Festival. He lost the former to Wheesung's "Goodbye Luv" and won the latter. He also won the Overseas Artist Award at the third South-East Music Ceremony in Fujian, China.

Track listing

Chinese version
 면구 / 面具 (Paralysis) 
 쓰레기 (Illusion)

Charts and sales

Weekly charts

Monthly charts and sales

Year-end charts and sales

References

External links
 Kangta's official website
 SM Entertainment's official website

2005 albums
Kangta albums
SM Entertainment albums
Jazz fusion albums
Pop rock albums by South Korean artists
Soul albums by South Korean artists